Terry Copp (born 1938) is a Canadian military historian and Professor Emeritus at Wilfrid Laurier University and is co-founder and Director of the Laurier Centre for Military and Strategic Disarmament Studies since the late 1980s.

Copp was born and raised in Montreal, Quebec. He was educated at Sir George Williams University (BA) and McGill University (MA), Copp first published The Anatomy of Poverty: The Condition of the Working Class in Montreal, 1897–1929. Toronto, McClelland & Stewart Limited, 1974. He established a reputation as one of Canada's foremost military historians. He founded the journal Canadian Military History.

His books include Cinderella Army: The Canadians in Northwest Europe, Fields of Fire: The Canadians in Normandy, No Price Too High, The Brigade: The Fifth Canadian Infantry Brigade and The Canadian Battlefields in Italy: Sicily and Southern Italy. He is a two time recipient (1990 and 1992) of the C.P. Stacey Prize.

He was involved in battlefield studies tours. He was also the military analyst for the acclaimed television series No Price Too High and a frequent contributor to Legion Magazine.

In November 2011, with Matt Symes and Nick Lachance, he co-authored Canadian Battlefields 1915–1918: A Visitor's Guide.

In November 2017, Terry Copp launched an online interactive e-book on the city of Montreal, Quebec during the First World War: montrealatwar.com

See also
 Maple Leaf Route

References

External links
 Terry Copp's Website
 Wilfrid Laurier University
 Laurier Centre for Military Strategic and Disarmament Studies
 Legion Magazine
 Montreal At War 1914 - 1918

1938 births
Anglophone Quebec people
Canadian military historians
Canadian male non-fiction writers
Historians of World War I
Historians of World War II
Living people
McGill University alumni
Sir George Williams University alumni
Academic staff of Wilfrid Laurier University
Writers from Montreal